The Schempp-Hirth Duo Discus is a high-performance two-seat glider primarily designed for fast cross-country flying, including gliding competitions.  Often, it is used for advanced training.

Design and development
The Duo Discus replaced the Janus as Schempp Hirth's high-performance two-seater trainer. It has a four-piece wing with a span of 20 metres. As with most tandem two-seat gliders, its wing is slightly swept forward so the wing root can be slightly aft to allow the rear pilot an improved view. Although it shares its name with the highly successful Standard Class Discus, any resemblance is only superficial. It first flew in 1993, and is still in production at the factory in Orlican in the Czech Republic. Its best glide ratio was measured as 44:1. An optional 'turbo' retractable two-stroke engine can be specified for extended gliding sessions. As of August 2007, over 500 Duo Discuses have been built. In the U.S. Air Force, it is known as the TG-15A. The chief rival of the Duo Discus is now the DG Flugzeugbau DG-1001.

Duo Discus X
A revised model, the Duo Discus X, was announced in 2005. This has landing flaps incorporated into the movement of the airbrake lever to improve its approach control, giving steeper and slower approaches. It also has winglets to improve thermal flying, and a sprung and lower retractable undercarriage.

Duo Discus XL
The Duo Discus XL is the latest version. It shares the same fuselage as the Schempp-Hirth Arcus, and the Schempp-Hirth Nimbus 4D. The cockpit is now 10 cm longer to improve seat comfort, security, space and ergonomics. The airbrake system has been moved 4 cm towards the leading edge, and now extends 18 mm higher. The XL is certified for simple aerobatics, including spinning. It can also be flown entirely from the back seat.

Duo Discus XLT
The Duo Discus XLT is a motorized version of the Duo Discus XL.

Specifications (XL)

See also

References

 Specifications of Schempp-Hirth Duo Discus

1990s German sailplanes
Duo Discus
Motor gliders
T-tail aircraft
Aircraft first flown in 1993